Britt is a community in the Canadian province of Ontario, located in the unincorporated township of Wallbridge in the Parry Sound District.

The community is located on the north shore of the Magnetawan River at Byng Inlet, approximately five kilometres west of Highway 69, at the end of Highway 526.

Like its neighbouring community of Byng Inlet on the south shore, Britt was originally a sawmill village, known as Byng Inlet North when the Burton Mill located there in 1880. As the lumber industry in this area had reached its peak, prior to the building of the CPR between 1903 and 1908, the community on the north shore was established as a port for receiving coal, required for the railway's steam locomotives. It was after this, that Byng Inlet North was renamed Britt for Thomas Britt, the CPR Superintendent of Fuels.

The community is not an incorporated municipality, but part of the Unorganized Centre Parry Sound District and is administered by a local services board.

The village is name-checked in Stompin’ Tom Connors’s song, “Around the Bay and Back Again,” from his 1969 album On Tragedy Trail with Stompin’ Tom Connors.

References

Communities in Parry Sound District
Designated places in Ontario
Local services boards in Ontario
Magnetawan River